This is a list of Tamil language films produced in the Tamil cinema in India that were released in 2015. Over 200 Tamil films released in 2015, the biggest number of films to come from a single film industry in India.

Post-amendment to the Tamil Nadu Entertainment Tax Act 1939 on 27 September 2011, Gross jumped to 130 per cent of Nett for films with non-Tamil titles and U certificates as well. Commercial Taxes Department disclosed 106.29 crore in entertainment tax revenue for the year. According to Ormax Media industry report, the Tamil film segment registered domestic nett box office receipts of 996 crore with 14 crore admissions.

Box office collection 
The list of highest-grossing Tamil films released in 2015, by worldwide box office gross revenue, are as follows:

Releases

January - June

July - December

Awards

Deaths 
M. S. Narayana - Nootrenbadhu (2011) and Maharaja (2011).
Chelladurai
M. S. Viswanathan

References

Tamil
2015
Tamil
2010s Tamil-language films